The Nansemond River is a  tributary of the James River in Virginia in the United States. Virginian colonists named the river for the Nansemond tribe of Native Americans, who had long inhabited the area. They continue as a federally recognized tribe in Virginia.

The river begins at the outlet of Lake Meade north of downtown Suffolk, which had historically marked the northern boundary of the city. The Nansemond River Light once signaled the river's confluence with the James.

The Nansemond River Bridge, once a toll bridge and part of U.S. Route 17, crosses the river near its mouth. Two other bridges cross the river, one from downtown Suffolk and one on Route 58.

The Nansemond National Wildlife Refuge is located along the river.

See also
List of rivers of Virginia

References

Tributaries of the James River
Rivers of Virginia
Rivers of Suffolk, Virginia